Wild and Woolly is a 1937 American Western film directed by Alfred L. Werker and written by Frank Fenton and Lynn Root. The film stars Jane Withers, Walter Brennan, Pauline Moore, Carl Switzer, Jackie Searl and Berton Churchill. The film was released on July 19, 1937, by 20th Century Fox.

Plot
Arnette Flynn's town is having its fifteenth year celebration, however in the background a criminal gang is planning a bank robbery while people are distracted celebrating.

Cast   
Jane Withers as Arnette Flynn
Walter Brennan as Gramp 'Hercules' Flynn
Pauline Moore as Ruth Morris
Carl Switzer as Zero
Jackie Searl as Chaunce Ralston
Berton Churchill as Edward Ralston
Douglas Fowley as Blackie Morgan 
Robert Wilcox as Frank Bailey
Douglas Scott as Leon Wakefield
Lon Chaney, Jr. as Dutch
Frank Melton as Barton Henshaw
Syd Saylor as Lutz

References

External links 
 

1937 films
20th Century Fox films
American Western (genre) films
1937 Western (genre) films
Films directed by Alfred L. Werker
American black-and-white films
1930s English-language films
1930s American films